Philip Anthony Sessarego (31 December 1952 – November 2008), also known by the pen-name Tom Carew, was a British soldier, adventurer and author, who published the best-selling book Jihad! – The Secret War in Afghanistan. His reputation and credibility were damaged by the revelation of false claims in the book, after which he retired from the public spotlight.

Early life
Sessarego was born in Hereford, Herefordshire, England, to a farming family.

Military career
In 1971 at the age of 18 he enlisted into the British Army as a Gunner in the Royal Artillery. After two years' service in 1973 he applied to join the Special Air Service Regiment at the age of 21, which was approved by the Royal Artillery. During aptitude trials for the S.A.S. he narrowly failed to pass through injury, and was held over in Regiment's training cadre pending physical recovery to try again. After several months with the Regiment's training cadre, he chose to abandon his application to join it, and left the British Army in December 1975.

After the army he worked on the family farm, but grew restless, and subsequently found employment using his military training as a mercenary soldier, with ex-members of the SAS, seeing service as an advisor to the Sri Lankan Army in counter-insurgency warfare in 1979, and in Afghanistan/Pakistan in the early 1980s with the United States Government's Defense Intelligence Agency, training the Afghan Mujahideen to fight the Soviet Union. During the 1980s-1990's he was involved in conflicts in the Balkans during the Bosnia War, South America and South Africa.

In 1991, he faked his own death to give the impression that he had been killed by a car bomb in Croatia, possibly trying to get out of paying maintenance to his estranged wife at their family home in Hereford, afterwards breaking off all contact with his family to maintain the ruse and relocating to Belgium, living under the assumed name of "Philip Stevenson". (Sessarego's family continued to believe that he was dead until one evening in late 2001 they saw him being interviewed as a published author and military expert on a British national television evening news show under the pseudonym of "Tom Carew").

Jihad! (2000)
In 1999, with the assistance of a ghost writer (Adrian Weale) Sessarego wrote an account of his military experiences in the Afghan-Soviet War entitled Jihad! – The Secret War in Afghanistan, which was published in 2000, stating erroneously in its text that he had been in that theatre of operations as a trooper in the Special Air Service. The book sold reasonably well, being serialized in The Sunday Times, with print-runs in several European countries, as well as Australia. A paperback edition was published in 2001. On 11 September 2001 Arab jihadists staged an attack within the continental United States of America, hi-jacking several commercial air-liners and suicidally crashing them into key commercial and governmental landmark buildings, and the aftermath of the event created an immense demand for information on the nature and motivation of the attackers, which transferred into a surge in sales of Jihad! in excess of 50,000 copies, making it a best-seller, and Sessarego (using the pen-name of "Tom Carew") an in-demand figure in the British media for expert comment on Jihadism.

Journalists interviewing him regularly referred to his SAS trooper background in line with the book's text, which Sessarego played along with, until being exposed by the British Broadcasting Corporation reporter George Eykyn, after the BBC had been contacted by a former member of the Regiment notifying it that Sessarego's claims in this regard were false. Sessarego was subsequently lured to the BBC on the pretense of an interview about Afghanistan, where on arrival he was aggressively evidentially confronted mid-interview by Eykyn accusing him of being an imposter, who had invented a non-existent career with the Special Air Service. Breaking off the interview Sessarego walked out of BBC Television Centre closely pursued to the entrance gate by Eykyn haranguing him with a television camera team in tow.

After the film of the confrontation was broadcast by the BBC's evening Newsnight show, Sessarego was generally ridiculed in the British media for being a "fantasist", calling into doubt not just his claims to have been a trooper in the SAS but the whole content of Jihad!. His publisher's attempts to defend the book's validity by offering to remove a small part of its text which had made the erroneous claims regarding the Regiment (with the book's ghostwriter Adrian Weale defending its content by ripping out one page of its text during an interview with the BBC as an illustration of how little space had been taken up with the claims regarding the Special Air Service) were not sufficient in stemming the media's condemnation, and the book was subsequently withdrawn from further sale. Sessarego withdrew from the media spotlight, his publishing/media career at an end.

Later life
Sessarego subsequently was reported as living in Belgium in impoverished circumstances selling ex-Army surplus military materials and running "survival" training courses.

Death
In January 2009, Philip Sessarego's badly decomposed body was found in a rented Antwerp garage where he had been covertly living for several months. He was 55 years of age. The cause of death was conjectured to be from the effects of accidental carbon monoxide poisoning. His body was subsequently cremated, and its ashes buried in the graveyard of St. Martin's Church, in Hereford.

Personal life
Sessarego married in 1977, the marriage producing a son and a daughter. A television documentary about his life and family relationships, entitled My Father the Mercenary was produced in 2009.

Publications
 Jihad! – The Secret War in Afghanistan.

References

1952 births
2008 deaths
Military personnel from Herefordshire
Royal Artillery soldiers
People from Hereford
Impostors
British mercenaries
2009 in Belgium
People who faked their own death
British male novelists
20th-century British novelists
20th-century British male writers
Deaths from carbon monoxide poisoning